Norbert Huber (born 14 August 1998) is a Polish professional volleyball player. He is a member of the Poland national team, and the 2022 Champions League winner. At the professional club level, he plays for ZAKSA Kędzierzyn-Koźle.

Career

Clubs
In 2017, he signed a contract with Cerrad Czarni Radom and debuted in PlusLiga.

National team
On 10 September 2016, Huber achieved a title of the U20 European Champion after winning 7 out of 7 matches in the tournament, and beating Ukraine in the final. On 2 July 2017, Poland, including Huber, achieved a title of the U21 World Champion after beating Cuba in the final (3–0). His national team won 47 matches in a row and never lost.

Honours

Clubs
 CEV Champions League
  2021/2022 – with ZAKSA Kędzierzyn-Koźle

 National championships
 2021/2022  Polish Cup, with ZAKSA Kędzierzyn-Koźle
 2021/2022  Polish Championship, with ZAKSA Kędzierzyn-Koźle
 2022/2023  Polish Cup, with ZAKSA Kędzierzyn-Koźle

Youth national team
 2016  CEV U20 European Championship
 2017  FIVB U21 World Championship

References

External links
 
 Player profile at PlusLiga.pl 
 Player profile at Volleybox.net

1998 births
Living people
People from Brzozów County
Polish men's volleyball players
Czarni Radom players
Skra Bełchatów players
ZAKSA Kędzierzyn-Koźle players
Middle blockers